Charles Fagan may refer to:

Charles Fagan (Alabama politician), Alabama state legislator
Charles Fagan (Irish politician) (1881–1974), Irish National Centre Party/Fine Gael/Independent politician
Charles Fagan (water polo) (1899–1977), Irish water polo player and olympian